Rhodothamnus is a genus of flowering plants in the family Ericaceae, disjunctly found in the Alps and Anatolia.

Species 
Species accepted by The Plant List, are as follows: 
Rhodothamnus chamaecistus (L.) Rchb.
Rhodothamnus leachianus (L.F. Hend.) H.F. Copel.

References 

Ericaceae genera
Ericoideae
Taxa named by Carl Linnaeus